Red sun or Red Sun may refer to:

Astronomy
 Red giant star
 Red dwarf star
 Any star with a suitable spectral type

Titled works
 Red Sun, a 1971 film 
 Red Sun (1970 film), a West German crime film
 "Red Sun", a track from Anoushka Shankar's 2005 album Rise
 "Red Sun" (紅日), a 1992 Cantopop song by Hacken Lee later released on collections with the same title
 "Red Sun", song from the original soundtrack of Metal Gear Rising: Revengeance

Other uses
 A nickname of the founder of People's Republic of China, Mao Zedong
 Rao (comics), the sun of Krypton, Superman's native world
 Red Sun, one of two versions of the video game Mega Man Battle Network 4
 Communist Party of Ecuador – Red Sun, a small Marxist–Leninist–Maoist guerrilla organization in Ecuador
 Red sunflower, a sunflower variety

See also
 Superman: Red Son, a comic book limited series
 Superman: Red Son (film), an animated film based on the comics